This article shows the rosters of all participating teams at the 2015 FIVB Volleyball Men's U21 World Championship in Mexico.

The following is the Argentinean roster in the 2015 FIVB Volleyball Men's U21 World Championship.

Head coach: Alejandro Grossi

The following is the Brazilian roster in the 2015 FIVB Volleyball Men's U21 World Championship.

Head coach: Leonardo Seixas

The following is the Canadian roster in the 2015 FIVB Volleyball Men's U21 World Championship.

Head coach: John Barrett

The following is the Chinese roster in the 2015 FIVB Volleyball Men's U21 World Championship.

Head coach: Genyin Ju

The following is the Cuban roster in the 2015 FIVB Volleyball Men's U21 World Championship.

Head coach: Rodolfo Sanchez

The following is the Egyptian roster in the 2015 FIVB Volleyball Men's U21 World Championship.

Head coach: Grzegorz Rys

The following is the French roster in the 2015 FIVB Volleyball Men's U21 World Championship.

Head coach: Jocelyn Trillon

The following is the Iranian roster in the 2015 FIVB Volleyball Men's U21 World Championship.

Head coach: Farhad Nafarzadeh

The following is the Italian roster in the 2015 FIVB Volleyball Men's U21 World Championship.

Head coach: Michele Totire

The following is the Japanese roster in the 2015 FIVB Volleyball Men's U21 World Championship.

Head coach: Shingo Sakai

The following is the Mexican roster in the 2015 FIVB Volleyball Men's U21 World Championship.

Head coach: Eduardo Murguia

The following is the Polish roster in the 2015 FIVB Volleyball Men's U21 World Championship.

Head coach: Jakub Bednaruk

The following is the Russian roster in the 2015 FIVB Volleyball Men's U21 World Championship.

Head coach: Mikhail Nikolaev

The following is the Slovenian roster in the 2015 FIVB Volleyball Men's U21 World Championship.

Head coach: Iztok Kšela

The following is the Turkish roster in the 2015 FIVB Volleyball Men's U21 World Championship.

Head coach: Barış Özdemir

The following is the American roster in the 2015 FIVB Volleyball Men's U21 World Championship.

Head coach: Daniel Friend

See also
2015 FIVB Volleyball Women's U20 World Championship squads

References

External links
Official website

FIVB Volleyball Men's U21 World Championship
FIVB Men's U21 World Championship
FIVB Men's Junior World Championship
International volleyball competitions hosted by Mexico
FIVB Volleyball World Championship squads